Ada Carrasco (14 September 1912 – 5 April 1994) was a Mexican film and television actress.

Early life
Carrasco was born in Mexico City, the daughter of Honorato Carrasco, an engineer, and the opera star Ada Navarrete.

Career
Carrasco started her career as an actress in 1952, and went on to make over 38 soap operas, including Los Ricos También Lloran, with Verónica Castro in 1979, Rosa Salvaje in 1987, De Frente al Sol in 1992, Más Allá del Puente in 1994, and finally, her last soap opera was made in 1994 in Marimar with Thalía.

She died of a heart attack on 5 April 1994.

She is also known for various film appearances from Two Mules for Sister Sara (1970) where she  opposite Clint Eastwood and Shirley Maclean, to OK Mister Pancho (1981) where she starred as a woman who travels to the United States with María Elena Velasco's character of La India María.

Personal life
Ada Carrasco's younger sister Queta Carrasco also was an actress as well as Ada's daughter Malena Doria. Ada Carrasco is the Grandmother of Andrea Rodríguez and producer Magda Rodríguez, therefore great-grandmother of the actress Andrea Escalona.

Selected filmography

Tres hombres en mi vida (1952)
Forbidden Fruit (1953) - Señora Luz María Gómez (uncredited)
Women Who Work (1953) - Espectadora defile de modas (uncredited)
The Photographer (1953) - Enfermera (uncredited)
El buen ladrón (1957)
Alma de acero (1957) - Doña Soledad de Gallardo
The Bravados (1958) - Sra. Parral (uncredited)
Mysteries of Black Magic (1958) - Espectadora nerviosa
Kermesse (1959) - Doña Rita
Nazarin (1959) - Josefa
Manicomio (1959) - Lola
Sonatas (1959) - Nana
El puma (1959) - Doña Luisa
A tiro limpio (1960) - Doña Luisa
El tesoro de Chucho el Roto (1960) - Blanca viuda de Villalta
Tin Tan y las modelos (1960) - Tía Eulalia (uncredited)
Simitrio (1960) - Mamá de Simitrio (uncredited)
Sobre el muerto las coronas (1961) - Tía de Marina
La Leona (1961, TV Series)
Juventud sin Dios (La vida del padre Lambert) (1962) - Madre de Andres
Los secretos del sexo débil (1962)
El tejedor de milagros (1962) - Doña Agustina
Atrás de las nubes (1962) - Beata chismosa (uncredited)
Un tipo a todo dar (1963) - Abuela
Casa de huéspedes (1964)
El señor doctor (1965) - Doña Lola
Los Cuervos están de luto (1965) - Esposa de Acasio
Especialista en chamacas (1965)
Maria Isabel (1966, TV Series) - Chona
El barón Brakola (1967) - Aurora
Si quiero (1967) - Mamá de novia
Los años verdes (1967)
Novias impacientes (1967)
El juicio de los hijos (1967, TV Series)
Santo vs. the Villains of the Ring (1968) - Maquilladora (uncredited)
Los recuerdos del porvenir (1969)
El libro de piedra (1969) - Paulina
La casa de las muchachas (1969)
Two Mules for Sister Sara (1970) - Juan's Mother
Simplemente vivir (1970) - María
Una vez, un hombre... (1971)
Temporada salvaje (1971)
Elena y Raquel (1971)
Lucía Sombra (1971, TV Series) - Campesina
Mi mesera (1973)
Renzo, el gitano (1973)
Me caí de la nube (1974) - Doña María
La casa de Bernarda Alba (1974, TV Movie) - Josefa, la abuela
El elegido (1977) - Madre de Andres
La puerta falsa (1977)
Balún Canán (1977) - La tullida
Las mariposas disecadas (1978) - Gloria / Maid
El cuatro dedos (1978)
Los amantes frios (1978) - Doña Chona (segment "El Soplador del vidrio")
Pedro Páramo (1978) - Madre de Pedro Páramo
Los triunfadores (1978) - Mamá de Fernando
Ardiente secreto (1978, TV Series)
La India blanca (1979) - Doña Juana, madre de Rutilo
Los Ricos También Lloran (1979, TV Series) - Felipa
Dos hermanos murieron (1980)
Hijos de tigre (1980) - Doña Chonita
El gatillo de la muerte (1980)
Pistoleros famosos (1981) - Lucio's Mother
Okey, Mister Pancho (1981) - Mujer inmigrante
Fuego en el mar (1981) - Rosario
La combi asesina (1982) - Daniela
Bianca Vidal (1982, TV Series) - Vicenta
Un hombre llamado el diablo (1983)
Fieras en brama (1983) - Nana
Maldita miseria (1983) - Doña Cholita
Lazos de sangre (1983)
El regreso del carro rojo (1984) - Dona Amalia
El criminal (1985)
Pistoleros famosos II (1986)
Tierra de rencores (1986)
Rosa Salvaje (1987, TV Series) - Carmen
Amor en silencio (1988, TV Series) - Ada
El gran relajo mexicano (1988)
Maton de rancho (1988)
Central camionera (1988)
Mi segunda madre (1989, TV Series) - Dolores
El chácharas (1989)
One Man Out (1989) - Peasant Lady
Atrapados (1990)
Amor de nadie (1990, TV Series) - Cony (1990)
Con el amor no se juega (1991) - Sirvienta
Como Agua Para Chocolate (1992) - Nacha
Jefe de vigilancia (1992)
De frente al sol (1992, TV Series) - Lich
Mas allá del puente (1993) - Doña Ema
Marimar (1994, TV Series) - Mamá Cruz (final appearance)

External links
 

1912 births
1994 deaths
Actresses from Mexico City
Mexican telenovela actresses
20th-century Mexican actresses
Mexican film actresses